The McCallum executive council was the 15th executive council of British Ceylon. The government was led by Governor Henry Edward McCallum.

Executive council members

See also
 Cabinet of Sri Lanka

References

1907 establishments in Ceylon
1913 disestablishments in Ceylon
Cabinets established in 1907
Cabinets disestablished in 1913
Ceylonese executive councils
Ministries of Edward VII
Ministries of George V